Garff is a surname. Notable people with the surname include:

Enrico Garff (born 1939), Italian painter
Joakim Garff (born 1960), Danish theologian 
Kendall D. Garff (1906–1997), American businessman
Melissa Garff Ballard, born Melissa Garff, American politician and music educator
Robert H. Garff (1942–2020), American businessman and politician